Igor Gubskiy (11 June 1954 – 8 February 2022) was a Ukrainian artist, rated 4A in the United Art Rating with individual style and relevant price recommendation. Igor Gubskiy is one of the few artists noted by State Tretyakov Gallery, as a 
bright representative of the Ukrainian school of the XX century, together with Tatyana Yablonskaya and Andriy Kotska. State Tretyakov Gallery, Moscow, Russian Federation.

The artworks of Igor Gubskiy are stored in National Art Museum of Ukraine, State Tretyakov Gallery (Moscow, Russian Federation), Malmo Art Museum 
(Sweden), Gorlovka Art Museum, Sumy Art Museum, Lugansk Art Museum, and private collections in Ukraine, Britain, Canada, Germany, Israel, The Netherlands, Sweden and the United States 
(New York City and Chicago).

Early period
Igor Gubskiy was born on June 11, 1954, in the small town Kadievka, Voroshilovgradskaya Region. His father, Ivan Gubskiy, was an artist, and his mother, Lyudmila Gubskaya, was a housewife. He spent his childhood in Kadievka, and later moved with his parents to Voroshilovgrad.

From 1969 Igor Gubsky has studied art in Voroshilovgrad Art School, in 1973 he graduated with honors and received a specialty of art and drafting teacher.

In 1973 after graduating from the Art School, he entered Kyiv State Art Institute, faculty of painting. After the second course, Igor Gubskiy studied in Victor Puzyrkov's workshop.

In 1981, after military service, Igor Gubskiy studied in Sergei Grigoriev's workshop for three years.

The artist participated at Christie's, Phillips, and all his artworks "Art and Life" (1985), "Urgent order" (1987), "Nap between battles" and many others were sold out at auctions.

Chronology
1974 – started to take part in local, national and all-union exhibitions 
1987 – awarded honorary diploma of the academy of Arts of the USSR
1987 – started to be exhibited internationally (Sweden, Syria, Norway, (Germany), Japan, etc.)
1988 – the artwork "Rebellion" was bought by the National Art Museum of Ukraine 
1990 – solo exhibition in Malmö, Sweden. All 22 artworks were sold out, one of 22 represented artworks was bought by State Malmö Art Museum.
1990 – participation in Christie's auction (all works were sold out).
1990 – participation in the Phillips's auction (all works were sold out).
1991 – the artwork "Watchman" was bought by State Tretyakov Art Gallery, Moscow.
1994 – exhibition in Ukraine National Museum of History, Kyiv, Ukraine.
Starting from 1999 – a permanent exhibition in "Yana" Gallery, Kyiv, Ukraine.

Period of stagnation and returning
Since 1994 due to some personal reasons Igor Gubskiy has started to paint not much and very rare.
The new round of painting has started in 2008. The first significant artwork Igor Gubskiy painted after such a long period of stagnation was " The Old Woman". It took almost a year to complete this work. The artist started to paint efficiently. During this period "Harlequins" and "Jews" become the key series of his artworks. The paintings of that period were regularly sold out by private collectors at Ukrainian auctions.

Chronology
2004 – was excluded from National Union of Ukrainian Artists 
2008 – solo exhibition in "Tadzio Gallery", Kyiv, Ukraine 
2009 – solo exhibition in "Persona Gallery", Kyiv, Ukraine 
2009 – solo exhibition in International Art Fair IV "Art-Kyiv 2009"
2010 – solo exhibition "The Women" in Art Fair "Interior Art", Museum of Spiritual Treasures of Ukraine[uk].
2010 – solo exhibition "The City" in International Art Fair "Fine Art Ukraine 2010"
2011 – solo exhibition in Moscow Art Fair XVI "ART MANEGE 2011", Central Exhibition Hall Manege, Moscow, Russian Federation
2011 – 2013 – solo exhibition in Art Forum "Fine Art Ukraine", Mystetskyi Arsenal, Kyiv, Ukraine 
2011 – exhibition in Moscow International Art Salon XVI CHA-2011. The Artist. The City" 

2012 – exhibition in Moscow International Art Salon XVII  "CHA-2012. The Roads              "
2013 – exhibition in Moscow International Art Salon XVIII "CHA-2013. The Process            "
2014 – exhibition in Moscow International Art Salon XIV   "CHA-2014. The Connection of Times"
2014 – solo exhibition in Fine Art Gallery "Manufacture", Kyiv, Ukraine 
2016 – exhibition in Lera Litvinova Gallery.

Expert assessments

The large part of Igor Gubskiy's artworks is portraits. To this genre, the artist remains paradoxical faithful in modern times. The style of his artworks continues the traditions of the psychological portrait of classical and pre-avant-garde art.
The artistic and technical practices of Igor Gubskiy's works refer us to the picturesque world of Diego Velázquez paintings, the expressive world of Francisco Goya paintings, dramatic world of Rembrandt paintings. Igor Gubskiy thoughtfully transforms the technical findings and techniques of Nikolay Feshin and Corneliu Baba in his artworks.

The art historian Roman Zvinyatskovskiy about the works that were represented at the exhibition in Malmö:
The people in Igor Gubskiy portraits are not fantastic figures. They are examples of ordinary people, maybe a little bit strange, from the artist's childhood, that made the strongest impressions on him. The artist often selects his motives from the so-called society of the lower strata, where he finds universal human and aesthetic values. Igor Gubsky does not seek to emphasize this in his paintings deliberately, but nevertheless, the result is evident. For me, Igor Gubskiy's art is "aristocratic democracy". This term, of course, contains two words that are opposites of each other, but this contrary characterizes the artist's art in the best way.

Ukrainian art critic Olesya Avramenko wrote:
Igor Gubskiy is an artist with a steady hand and a precise eye, who brings life to his paintings with a few dynamic strokes. His works are full of life and trembling. He is the genius master who can brilliantly translate natural impressions into sharp, expressive, recognizable images. The artist skillfully and effortlessly knows how to create ordinary but vividly expressive images, which is an unprecedented thing even for notorious realist painters.

Personal life and death
Gubskiy died on 8 February 2022, at the age of 67.

References

External links

1954 births
2022 deaths
Ukrainian painters
Ukrainian male painters
Portrait artists
Ukrainian artists
People from Stakhanov, Ukraine